Juncus mexicanus is a species of rush known by the common name Mexican rush. It is native to the southwestern quadrant of the United States and parts of Mexico and Central and South America. It is a plant of moist areas in a great number of habitats, from coast to desert to mountain and low to high elevation.

Description
This is a rhizomatous perennial herb which varies in appearance. The thin erect stems reach a maximum height anywhere from 10 to 80 centimeters. The leaves grow from the base of the stem and can exceed 20 centimeters in length. The inflorescence usually sprouts from the side of the stem rather than the tip.

The flowers grow on long peduncles. Each individual flower has thick tepals with longitudinal stripes which vary in color from bright to dark. It has six stamens with very large anthers, and long stigmas. This species is sometimes treated as a variant of Juncus arcticus or Juncus balticus.

References

External links 
 Jepson Manual Treatment
 Flora of North America
 Photo gallery

mexicanus
Freshwater plants
Flora of the Western United States
Flora of Central Mexico
Flora of California
Flora of the Sierra Nevada (United States)
Flora of the California desert regions
Flora of Central America
Plants described in 1829
Flora without expected TNC conservation status